Antselovich is a rural locality (a selo) in Morozovskoye Rural Settlement, Rossoshansky District, Voronezh Oblast, Russia. The population was 462 as of 2010. There are 3 streets.

Geography 
Antselovich is located 14 km south of Rossosh (the district's administrative centre) by road. Morozovka is the nearest rural locality.

References 

Rural localities in Rossoshansky District